Hindi media refers to media in Hindi language and its dialects, across the Hindi belt in India, and elsewhere with the Hindi-speaking Indian diaspora.

Hindi media has a two hundred year history, with the first newspaper published in the language, Udant Martand, going to press in 1826, and the first novel, Pariksha Guru, published in 1882.

News Papers
Hindi Journalism Day, May 30, is considered to be a very important day for Hindi journalism, because the first newspaper in Hindi language, Udant Martand was published on this day.
Pandit Jugal Kishore Shukla started it as a weekly newspaper from Calcutta on 30 May 1826. He was the publisher and editor himself.
For this reason, Pandit Jugal Kishore Shukla has a special place in the world of Hindi journalism. Before 1826, many newspapers were being published in English, Persian, and Bangla, but not a single newspaper came out in Hindi.
Keeping this in view, Jugal Kishore started the publication of 'Udant Martand'. This letter used to come out every Tuesday.
However, in the beginning of 'Udanta Martand' no one had imagined that Hindi journalism would later come and take such a big size and it would become so important.

'Udanta Martand'
Pandit Jugal Kishore Shukla was originally from Kanpur who wanted to give more importance to journalism despite being a lawyer.
But at that time, the colonial British had made Calcutta their place of work, due to which it became a big challenge to talk about the rights of the Indians in India. Therefore, 'Udanta Martand' of Jugal Kishore Shukla can be called a kind of bold experiment.
Before the Hindi newspaper was published in the Bengal state of the country, the newspaper was published in other languages. There was no Hindi newspaper previously. 

The Hindi newspaper was also published from Bengal, the credit of which goes to Pandit Jugal Kishore Shukla. The publication of Udant Martand was started from 27 No. Amadtalla Gali of Kolu Tola Mohalla in Calcutta.Hindi's first newspaper started in some way
Originally a resident of Kanpur, Pandit Jugal Kishore Shukla was fluent in Sanskrit, Persian, English and Bengali languages. He first worked as a Proceeding Reader in the Sadar Diwani Adalat in Kanpur and later became a lawyer. After which he tried to start 'Udant Martand' newspaper. He got permission from the Governor General on February 19, 1826 to face financial constraints
Udant Martand was a weekly newspaper. In whose first issue 500 copies were published, but due to lack of knowledge of Hindi language, the trend of the readers was rarely seen. The cost of sending it to Hindi belt states was very high. Jugal Kishore made a lot of requests to the govt.to give some concession in postal rates but the British government was not ready for it. The Newspaper had to be closed in a few months.

Due to financial constraints, the life of this newspaper could not last long. Only 79 issues of Udant Martand,which were to be published in book format every Tuesday, could be published. Which was closed on 4 December 1827 due to financial troubles.

The first Hindi-language newspaper published in India, Udant Martand (The Rising Sun), started on 30 May 1826. This day is celebrated as "Hindi Journalism Day", or Hindi Patrakarita Diwas, as it marked the beginning of journalism in Hindi language. India has a long history of printing. The first printing press was set up as early as in 1674 in Mumbai (Bombay). Calcutta General Advertiser, the first newspaper of India (also known as the Hicky's Bengal Gazette), started in January 1780, and the first Hindi daily, Samachar Sudha Varshan, started in 1854 - three years before the Indian Rebellion of 1857.

On 30 May 1826, Udant Martand  (The Rising Sun), the first Hindi-language newspaper published in India, started from Calcutta (now Kolkata), published every Tuesday by Pt. Jugal Kishore Shukla.

Hindi news media has a dominant presence in a large part of the country. India is a multi-lingual country, and the Hindi belt is a group of states which are predominantly Hindi-speaking. The Hindi belt is commonly understood to include the states of Haryana, Himachal Pradesh, Rajasthan, Uttar Pradesh, Uttarakhand, Bihar, Jharkhand, Madhya Pradesh, Chhattisgarh and the union territories of Delhi and Chandigarh.

Hindi media today
Currently India publishes about 1,000 Hindi dailies that have a total circulation of about 80 million copies. English, the second language in terms of number of daily newspapers, has about 250 dailies with a circulation of about 40 million copies. Prominent Hindi newspapers include Dainik Jagran, Dainik Bhaskar, Amar Ujala, Navbharat Times, Hindustan Dainik and Rajasthan Patrika

In terms of readership, Dainik Jagran is the most popular Hindi daily, with a total readership (TR) of 54,583,000, according to IRS Round One 2009. Dainik Bhaskar is the second most popular with a total readership of 33,500,000. Amar Ujala with TR of 28,674,000, Hindustan Dainik with TR of 26,769,000 and Rajasthan Patrika with a TR of 14,051,000 are placed at the next three positions. The total readership of the top 10 Hindi dailies is estimated at 188.68 million, nearly five times the top 10 English dailies, which have 38.76 million total readership. Others Hindi dailies target online readership using medium like YouTube and other social media.

Hindi news channels
Prominent Hindi television news channels include India TV, News18 India, ABP News, Zee News, Aaj Tak, NDTV India, News 24  and News World India.

The most popular Hindi news websites are primarily the online versions of the Hindi newspapers and news channels.

Hindi News Portal 
Nowadays, news is being digitised with the revolution and advancement in technology and all the big players in this field including BBC, News18, Dainik Jagran, Dainik Bhaskar, Amar Ujala, Times Group, CG Superfast News have made their presence known to the world and following their foot steps in digital news hyperlocal news portals are starting to contribute to the market and many more are getting benefited from this opportunity arises due to the increase in online readers of news.

References